Lađevci may refer to:

 Lađevci (Kraljevo), Serbia
 Lađevci (Čajniče), Republika Srpska, Bosnia and Herzegovina
 Lađevci (Čelinac), Republika Srpska, Bosnia and Herzegovina
 Lađevci Airport, in Serbia